This article presents the complete discography of Julian Casablancas as a solo artist.

Studio albums

Extended plays

Singles

As lead artist

As featured artist

Collaborations

Other appearances

Notes

References

Discographies of American artists
Rock music discographies